Riele Downs (born July 8, 2001) is a Canadian actress. She began her career as a child actress, playing Faith in the 2013 film The Best Man Holiday. She went on to co-star as Charlotte on the Nickelodeon television series Henry Danger from 2014 to 2020. In 2022, she starred as Darby Harper in the Hulu film Darby and the Dead.

Life and career
Downs was born on July 8, 2001. She has indicated that she has "some experience with dancing".

Downs started acting when she was 3 years old, and got her first role in the 2005 film Four Brothers playing the role of Amelia Mercer. She appeared in A Russell Peters Christmas Special in 2013. The same year,  Downs played Faith Sullivan in the 2013 comedy-drama film The Best Man Holiday. In 2014, she appeared in the television films Fir Crazy and The Gabby Douglas Story.

In 2014, Downs was cast in her first starring role, on the Nickelodeon television series Henry Danger, playing the role of Charlotte, who is the best friend of the titular character. In 2017 she co-starred with Lizzy Greene in the Nickelodeon television film Tiny Christmas. In 2022, Downs starred in the lead role of Darby Harper in the Hulu film Darby and the Dead.

Filmography

Awards and nominations

References

External links
 
 

2001 births
Canadian film actresses
Living people
Canadian child actresses
Canadian television actresses
21st-century Canadian actresses
Actresses from Toronto
Black Canadian actresses